Nethra Raghuraman is an Indian actress and model. She has been selected as Look Of The Year contest winner for Femina magazine in 1997. She also won the Best Female Newcomer title at Star Screen Awards in 2000. Her most notable films include Thakshak by Govind Nihalani and Bhopal Express, a David Lynch presentation. Raghuraman has appeared in various music videos and won the TV reality show Fear Factor: Khatron Ke Khiladi 1 in 2008.

Personal life
She was born into a Tamil Iyer Brahmin family  Nethra married Singapore-based businessman, Kunal Guha, son of Indian cricketer Subrata Guha, in late 2011.

Filmography

Television
2008 - Fear Factor: Khatron Ke Khiladi 1 as Winner
1999 - Captain Vyom as Naina

References

External links
 

Living people
1976 births
Indian film actresses
Indian female models
Actresses in Hindi cinema
Actresses in Tamil cinema
Actresses in Gujarati cinema
Actresses in Hindi television
21st-century Indian actresses
20th-century Indian actresses
Indian Hindus
Screen Awards winners
Fear Factor: Khatron Ke Khiladi participants